Red Rock (also known as Red Valley) is an unincorporated community and census-designated place (CDP) in Apache County, Arizona, United States. Red Rock has a post office with ZIP code 86544; the post office uses the Red Valley name. As of the 2010 census, the Red Rock CDP had a population of 169.

Red Rock is named after a nearby  sandstone peak. The area was first noted by white military men in 1892 when Lt. W. C. Brown observed many springs during a water survey. A trading post was established in 1906.

Demographics

Education
Red Rock is within the Red Mesa Unified School District, which operates Red Valley/Cove High School.

The Bureau of Indian Education (BIE) operates Red Valley Day School, a federal K-8 school for Native Americans. Additionally, the BIE operates Cove Day School, which takes students from the nearby area.

References

Unincorporated communities in Apache County, Arizona
Unincorporated communities in Arizona
Navajo Nation